Ek Tamanna Lahasil Si is a 2012 Pakistani drama serial directed by Syed Atif Hussain and written by Wasi Shah. Serial was first aired on 3 October 2012 on Hum TV. It stars Fahad Mustafa, Jana Malik, Hassan Niazi, Mawra Hocane, Humayun Ashraf, Babar Khan and Saba Hameed.

The series was also aired in India on the Zindagi TV channel.

Plot 

Nadia is invited to her cousin Hira's wedding. She marries her cousin Mohsin and is abused by her husband and mother-in-law. But her brother-in-law supports her a lot. She goes crazy when she is not allowed to leave the house with her father-in-law for her mother's funeral. she is pregnant with a baby, which her husbands says is not his. After her husband killed his boss for firing him and got in jail; he was soon hung, but before being hung he said sorry for what he did and admitted that the baby is his. Then she gave birth to a baby boy and married her other cousin. Next, her terrible mother-in-law loses her sanity.

Cast 
 Fahad Mustafa as Mohsin
 Mawra Hocane as Nadia
 Saba Hameed as Ruqaiyya
 Jana Malik as Hira
 Hassan Niazi as Ali
 Saba Faisal
 Salma Shaheen
 Farah Nadeem as Anuma
 Qaiser Naqvi as Rukiya
 Humayoun Ashraf as Shehzaad
 Babar Khan as Ehsan
 Sarah Razi
 Shahzad Malik
 Kulsoom Malik

See also
List of programmes broadcast by Zindagi TV
List of programs broadcast by Hum TV
List of Pakistani television serials

References

External links 
 Official website

2012 Pakistani television series debuts
Pakistani drama television series
Hum TV original programming
Urdu-language television shows